Casemate Fort, Whiting Quadrangle, also known as "Old Casemate," Officers Club Bldg. #207, Sentry Booth #220, and Fort Hamilton Community Club, is a historic building located in Fort Hamilton, Brooklyn, New York, New York. The old fort was designed in 1819 and built between 1825 and 1836.  It is a brick and stone "C" shaped structure with all walls approximately three feet thick.  The building and adjoining stone walls form a type of fortification known as a "walled enceinte".

It was listed on the National Register of Historic Places in 1974.

References

Military facilities on the National Register of Historic Places in New York City
Military facilities in Brooklyn
Infrastructure completed in 1836
National Register of Historic Places in Brooklyn